Sora Ma (born 22 January 1984) is a Malaysian actress based in Singapore. She resigned as a full-time Mediacorp artiste on 2017.

Career
Former commerce graduate, model and beauty queen-turned-artiste - Sora Ma, entered show business by being a Top 5 finalist in Star Search 2010 and winning the Friendship Award. Ma was offered a contract by MediaCorp after reaching the top 5 in Star Search 2010. Ma has a fan club called Sorarity. In 2012, Ma won her first nomination for her role in Love Thy Neighbour.  In 2014, she was nominated for BottomSlim Sexiest Legs Award and Asian Skin Solution Award. She also won a nomination at the Asian Television Awards 2014 for her role in C.L.I.F 3.  In 2015, she was nominated for London Choco Roll Happiness Award and Tokyo Bust Express Sexy Babe Award. In 2017, Ma gain her first Top 10 Most Popular Female Artistes nomination and won her first Top 10 Most Popular Female Artistes.

On 31 December 2017, she said in an instagram post that she would be leaving Mediacorp. She now runs her own production company, Socius Realm.

In 2022, Ma won the Best Supporting Actress for her role in the drama, This Land is Mine, at the Asia Contents Awards.

Personal life
Ma studied at Kuala Lumpur Metropolitan University College and graduated from Curtin University in Perth, Australia, specialising in management and marketing. Prior to joining Star Search, she did some modeling and worked as a financial planner.

In June 2021, Ma announced that she is engaged to her boyfriend of eight years. She registered her marriage later in October and held a wedding banquet in Singapore on 24 July 2022.

Filmography

Television

Awards and nominations

References

External links
Profile on xin.msn.com

Living people
Malaysian television actresses
Singaporean television actresses
Curtin University alumni
People from Kedah
Malaysian people of Chinese descent
Singaporean people of Teochew descent
Financial planners
21st-century Malaysian actresses
1984 births